Joseph Lockey Yon, also known as credited as Jon Locke, (October 10, 1927 – October 19, 2013) was an American actor who appeared in many television and film westerns.

Early life
Locke was borne in Orlando, Florida. He became involved in theater while earning his bachelor's degree at Florida State University. Locke enlisted in the United States Air Force, where he began performing in a play about Korean War pilots called Flame-Out.

Career

His television credits included westerns, including Bonanza, Gunsmoke, and The Virginian, as well as non-western series such as The Bionic Woman, The Dukes of Hazzard, The Mary Tyler Moore Show, and Perry Mason. Locke had recurring roles as Officer Garvey on the 1950s  crime drama series, Highway Patrol, and as a Sleestak leader in the NBC television series, Land of the Lost, during the 1970s. In a 1976 episode ("Abominable Snowman") of Land of the Lost he played the Snowman.

Personal life

Outside of television, Locke played the banjo for an annual western film festival held in Lone Pine, California. He belonged to the Reel Cowboy, which are a social group of western actors who meet in the San Fernando Valley. In addition to acting, Locke worked as an office manager for a real estate firm in San Fernando.

Death

Jon Locke, a longtime resident of Van Nuys, California, died from complications of a stroke at Holy Cross Medical Center in Mission Hills, California, on October 19, 2013, at the age of 86.

Filmography

References

External links

1927 births
2013 deaths
American male television actors
Male Western (genre) film actors
Florida State University alumni
Male actors from Florida